This article lists of ballroom and social dance albums.

Most of them are specifically compiled with the aim of ballroom/social dancing, but some authored albums which are commonly considered highly danceable are included here as well.

This list of dance music is intended to aid partner dancing, and therefore it doesn't include most of disco, hip-hop, rock and roll, and other highly danceable genres.

Further, a number partner dancing styles such as salsa and swing have dedicated albums.

International Style Ballroom 

This section lists albums specifically compiled for International Style ballroom dancing. As a rule, they contain all 10 dances of the International ballroom category. Some are separately dedicated to Standard or Latin groups of dances, others are dedicated to a single ballroom dance.

Superior Dancing series
Tanz Orchester Klaus Hallen series
Casa Musica (albums) series
Giants of Latin series
C.F.D. series by Ross Mitchell Orchestra
Best Selection For Ballroom Dancing by Hisao Sudou and The New Downbeats Orchestra, Japan
Feel the Rhythm

See also
Dance music
Lists of albums

 
Ballroom and social dance albums